Pasquale Aiese (born 27 April 1962) is an Italian lightweight rower. He won a gold medal at the 1982 World Rowing Championships in Lucerne with the lightweight men's four. He competed at the 1984 Summer Olympics in the coxless pair with Marco Romano where they came fifth.

References

1962 births
Living people
Italian male rowers
World Rowing Championships medalists for Italy
Olympic rowers of Italy
Rowers at the 1984 Summer Olympics
20th-century Italian people